Fresh Records has been the name of at least two different record labels in the 20th century:

 Fresh Records (US) - a US-based company.
 Fresh Records (UK) - a UK-based company.

See also
 Minty Fresh Records